Boel Bengtsson (born 27 May 1972) is a Swedish sailor. She competed in the women's 470 event at the 1996 Summer Olympics.

References

External links
 

1972 births
Living people
Swedish female sailors (sport)
Olympic sailors of Sweden
Sailors at the 1996 Summer Olympics – 470
People from Härryda Municipality
Sportspeople from Västra Götaland County